Gordon Irwin Miller (February 26, 1924 – February 23, 2021) was a politician in Ontario, Canada. He served in the Legislative Assembly of Ontario as a Liberal from 1975 to 1990.

Background
Miller was educated in Jarvis and worked as a farmer. Miller's son Doug was a candidate of the Ontario Liberal Party in 1999 in the riding of Haldimand—Norfolk—Brant.

Politics
He was a school trustee from 1960 to 1967, a councillor from 1968 to 1971, a reeve from 1971 to 1973 and a regional councillor from 1973 to 1975.

He was elected to the Ontario legislature in the 1975 provincial election, defeating Progressive Conservative Jim Allan by 1,955 votes in the rural riding of Haldimand—Norfolk.  He was re-elected by a greater margin in the 1977 election, and again in 1981, 1985 and 1987.

He was defeated in the 1990 provincial election, losing to NDP candidate Norm Jamison by almost 4,000 votes.

References

External links
 

1924 births
2021 deaths
Ontario Liberal Party MPPs
People from Haldimand County